Ana Esmeralda (7 December 1931 – 22 November 2022) was a Moroccan-born Spanish film actress.

Selected filmography
 Lola the Coalgirl (1952)
 María Dolores (1953)
 Bronze and Moon (1953)
 Carmen (1953)
 College Boarding House (1959)
 La casa de la Troya (1959)
 São Paulo, Sociedade Anônima (1965)

References

Bibliography 
 Goble, Alan. The Complete Index to Literary Sources in Film. Walter de Gruyter, 1999.

External links 
 

1928 births
2022 deaths
Spanish film actresses